The 2001 Wake Forest Demon Deacons football team was an American football team that represented Wake Forest University during the 2001 NCAA Division I-A football season. In their first season under head coach Jim Grobe, the Demon Deacons compiled a 6–5 record and finished in a tie for seventh place in the Atlantic Coast Conference.  Notably, the team ended a 17-game losing streak against conference opponent Virginia.

Schedule

Team leaders

References

Wake Forest
Wake Forest Demon Deacons football seasons
Wake Forest Demon Deacons football